Taiwanese units of measurement (Chinese: , Taiwanese Hokkien: Tâi-chè, Hakka: Thòi-chṳ, Mandarin: Táizhì) are the customary and traditional units of measure used in Taiwan. The Taiwanese units formed in the 1900s when Taiwan was under Japanese rule. The system mainly refers to Japanese system. The measurement refers to the traditional size of a Japanese flooring mat called a Tatami mat (made of woven dried grass) which were positioned to completely cover the floor of traditional Japanese homes, therefore it became a convenient measurement tool as mat area was standardised hundreds of years ago. In Taiwan the measurement units are pronounced in Taiwanese Hokkien and Hakka before the World War II and adopted by the Mandarin speaking immigrants from China in 1949. Today, the Taiwanese units are used exclusively, in some cases alongside official SI units, and in other cases they have been replaced by SI.

Although the Taiwanese units have similar names to those in Chinese units of measurement and Hong Kong units of measurement, the standards are different from those used in China and Hong Kong due to them being Japanese in origin.

Length
Linear measure in Taiwan is largely metric but some units derived from traditional Japanese units of measurement remain in use as a legacy of Japanese rule.

Taiwanese length units and the translation of length units in Metric system (SI) shares the same character. The adjective Taiwanese can be added to address the Taiwanese unis system. For example,  means Taiwanese foot and  means meter.

Area

Unlike with other measures, area continues to be almost commonly measured with traditional units. Taiwanese units of area are derived from both traditional Dutch and Japanese measurements. The unit is derives from the Japanese tsubo, the base unit of the Japanese area. The unit is derived from the obsolete Dutch morgen, which was introduced during Taiwan's Dutch era. In the later era Kingdom of Tungning,  (Taiwanese Hokkien: lê, Hakka: lài, Mandarin: lí) is defined to represent the area that could be farmed by one man with one ox and one plow in one day. Today, the rule for converting the two major units from two different sources is

Officially, land area is measured in square metres.

Volume
Volume measure in Taiwan is largely metric, with common units such as liter and milliliter.

Mass

Packaged goods in Taiwan largely use metric measurements but bulk foodstuffs sold in wet markets and supermarkets are typically measured with units derived from traditional Japanese units of mass, which are similar but not equivalent to corresponding Chinese units of mass. Imported goods from the US also retains its weight in ounces, although most such packages also lists the weight in grams.

Note the tael and catty are widely used.

See also
Units, Systems, & History of measurement
Chinese & Hong Kong units of measurement
Japanese, Korean, Mongolian & Vietnamese units of measurement

Notes

References

External links
 Weights and Measures in Use in Taiwan

Systems of units
Units of measurement by country
Hokkien-language phrases